Edoardo Amaldi (5 September 1908 – 5 December 1989) was an Italian physicist. He coined the term "neutrino" in conversations with Enrico Fermi distinguishing it from the heavier "neutron". He has been described as "one of the leading nuclear physicists of the twentieth century." He was involved in the anti-nuclear peace movement.

Life and career
Amaldi was born in Carpaneto Piacentino, the son of Ugo Amaldi, professor of mathematics at the University of Padua, and Luisa Basini.

Amaldi graduated under the supervision of Enrico Fermi and was his main collaborator until 1938, when Fermi left Italy for the United States. In 1939, Amaldi was drafted into the Royal Italian Army and returned to physics in 1941.

After WWII, Amaldi held the chair of "General Physics" at the Sapienza University of Rome, rebuilt the post-Fermi school of physics, and was the co-founder of the Italian National Institute for Nuclear Physics and of ESRO. He was the general secretary of CERN at its early stages when operations were still provisional, before September's 1954 official foundation. He pioneered in Europe the search for gravitational waves.

His main scientific results were on slow neutrons in the Fermi group, and the evidence for antiproton annihilations with emulsion techniques, somewhat contemporary to its production in accelerators by Emilio Segrè and collaborators. Amaldi co-authored about 200 scientific publications ranging from atomic spectroscopy and nuclear physics to elementary particle physics and experimental gravitation, as well as textbooks for secondary schools and universities. He also wrote historical-scientific books; for example, a biography of his  friend Ettore Majorana who mysteriously disappeared. He was elected a Foreign Honorary Member of the Soviet Academy of Sciences in 1958, an International Member of the American Philosophical Society in 1961, and both the American Academy of Arts and Sciences and the United States National Academy of Sciences in 1962. In 1963 he became foreign member of the Royal Netherlands Academy of Arts and Sciences. On 25 April 1968, he was elected as a Foreign Member of the Royal Society.

Amaldi died unexpectedly on 5 December 1989, still in full activity, while he was president of the Accademia dei Lincei, of which he had been a member since 1948.

The third Automated Transfer Vehicle of the European Space Agency bore his name.

See also
 Via Panisperna boys
 I ragazzi di via Panisperna (movie)
 Nuclear power in Italy

References

External links

 Oral History interview transcript with Edoardo Amaldi on 8 April 1963, American Institute of Physics, Niels Bohr Library and Archives
 Oral History interview transcript with Edoardo Amaldi on 9 April 1969, American Institute of Physics, Niels Bohr Library and Archives
 Oral History interview transcript with Edoardo Amaldi on 10 April 1969, American Institute of Physics, Niels Bohr Library and Archives
 Annotated bibliography for Edoardo Amaldi from the Alsos Digital Library for Nuclear Issues
 Amaldi's profile on INSPIRE-HEP

1908 births
1989 deaths
People associated with CERN
Fellows of the American Academy of Arts and Sciences
Foreign Members of the Royal Society
Foreign associates of the National Academy of Sciences
Foreign Members of the USSR Academy of Sciences
Italian relativity theorists
Members of the Royal Netherlands Academy of Arts and Sciences
People from the Province of Piacenza
Academic staff of the Sapienza University of Rome
Members of the Lincean Academy
Presidents of the International Union of Pure and Applied Physics
Members of the Royal Swedish Academy of Sciences
Members of the American Philosophical Society